Massilioclostridium is a Gram-positive, strict anaerobic, non-spore-forming and non-motile bacterial genus from the family of Clostridiaceae with one known species (Massilioclostridium coli). Massilioclostridium coli has been isolated from the left colon of a patient.

References

Clostridiaceae
Bacteria genera
Monotypic bacteria genera
Taxa described in 2017